The canton of Briançon-1 is an administrative division of the Hautes-Alpes department, in southeastern France. It was created at the French canton reorganisation which came into effect in March 2015. Its seat is in Briançon.

It consists of the following communes: 
 
Briançon (partly)
Cervières 
La Grave
Le Monêtier-les-Bains
Puy-Saint-André
Puy-Saint-Pierre
Saint-Chaffrey
La Salle-les-Alpes
Villar-d'Arêne
Villar-Saint-Pancrace

References

Cantons of Hautes-Alpes